The 2006 World Modern Pentathlon Championships were held in Guatemala City, Guatemala  from November 18 to November 20.

Medal summary

Men's events

Women's events

See also
Modern Pentathlon at the 2008 Summer Olympics
World Modern Pentathlon Championship

References

 Sport123

Modern pentathlon in North America
World Modern Pentathlon Championship
World Modern Pentathlon Championship
International sports competitions hosted by Guatemala
Sport in Guatemala City